, also known as , is the first Japanese daily sports newspaper, having been founded in 1948. In a 1997 report it was called one of the "Big Three" sports papers in Japan, out of a field of 17 sports dailies.

It is an affiliate newspaper of the Mainichi Shimbun.

See also 
Masters GC Ladies
Miss Nippon
Mizuno Classic

References

External links 
 

Daily newspapers published in Japan
Sports newspapers published in Japan
Publications established in 1948
1948 establishments in Japan